The Ukrainian Cultural and Educational Centre—also known as Oseredok (Ukrainian for 'centre')—is a museum, gallery, and library in Winnipeg, Manitoba, celebrating the Ukrainian Canadian community. It is the largest Ukrainian cultural institution of its kind in Canada.

Founded in 1944 by the Ukrainian National Federation of Canada, the museum collects and preserves materials and artifacts including documents, ancient maps, rare books, film, photographs, items of folk art, pioneers' tools, musical instruments, and regional folk costumes. The gallery exhibits work of Canadian and international Ukrainian artists.

The library holds over 40,000 books and periodicals in Ukrainian and English including collections of children's books, folklore, music, humanities and sciences, a rare book collection and reference materials.

The museum is affiliated with the CMA, CHIN, and Virtual Museum of Canada.

Hours of operation: Monday – Saturday (10 AM – 4 PM)

The centre held an online art auction of works donated by artists and city collectors that ran until 9 p.m. on May 4. Proceeds would go to the Canada-Ukraine Fund, as well as Oseredok’s initiatives to assist Ukrainian refugees arriving in Manitoba.

External links 
 Oseredok (official website)
 2018-19 Annual Report

References

1944 establishments in Manitoba
Museums in Winnipeg
Libraries in Manitoba
Ukrainian-Canadian culture in Manitoba
Ukrainian museums in Canada
Folk art museums and galleries
Arts organizations of the Ukrainian diaspora
Arts organizations established in 1944
Ukrainian cultural centres

Downtown Winnipeg
Municipal Historical Resources of Winnipeg